Jarahi or Jarrahi may refer to:
 Jarahi, Mahvelat, Razavi Khorasan Province
 Jarrahi, Sabzevar, Razavi Khorasan Province
 Jarahi Rural District, in Khuzestan Province
 Jarahi River, in Khuzestan Province